International Boundary Marker No. 1, U.S. and Mexico is a monument on the Mexico–U.S. border, on the west bank of the Rio Grande River near El Paso, Texas.  It was listed on the National Register of Historic Places in 1974 and designated as a National Historic Civil Engineering Landmark by the American Society of Civil Engineers in 1976.

The monument was placed there in 1855 by the Emory-Salazar Commission. The monument was repaired in 1892 by the Barlow-Blanco Commission, and again in 1929 by the International Boundary Commission. It was repainted in 1933 and in 1959, the latter time by the International Boundary and Water Commission (IBWC). It was refurbished in 1966 by both sections of the IBWC, which stripped its old plaster coating down to the original masonry monument and re-faced it with white marbleized concrete. A  concrete slab platform was added then, too.

It has also been known as Western Land Boundary Marker No. 1, U.S. and Mexico.

It is located in Doña Ana County, New Mexico, west of El Paso off Interstate 10.

References

External links
American Society of Civil Engineers - International Boundary Marker

		
National Register of Historic Places in Doña Ana County, New Mexico
Buildings and structures completed in 1848
Historic Civil Engineering Landmarks